P83 may refer to:
 Bell XP-83, an American prototype fighter aircraft
 FB P-83 Wanad, a pistol
 BRM P83, a Formula One racing car
 , a patrol boat of the Royal Australian Navy
 , a submarine of the Royal Navy
 , a corvette of the Indian Navy
 Papyrus 83, a biblical manuscript
 P83, a state regional road in Latvia